To Be Free may refer to:
To Be Free, Jackie DeShannon album
"To Be Free" (Mike Oldfield song), a single by musician Mike Oldfield, released in 2002. It is from the album Tres Lunas. The main vocalist is the Jazz singer Jude Sim
"To Be Free" (Arashi song), a 2010 song recorded by Japanese boy band Arashi
"To Be Free" (L D R U song), a 2017 song recorded by Australian group L D R U
To Be Free (Alyosha song)
To Be Free, Princess Jasmines' solo song in Disney's Aladdin: A Musical Spectacular
II B Free, a 1995 album by Louchie Lou & Michie One